Rex V. Darling (October 2, 1914 – October 14, 1996) was an American football, basketball, and tennis coach.  He was the 12th head football coach at Eastern Illinois State College—now known as Eastern Illinois University—in Charleston, Illinois, serving for one season, in 1951, and compiling a record of 4–2–2.  Darling was also the head basketball coach at Eastern Illinois from 1964 to 1967, tallying a mark of 42–55.  He was the school's head tennis coach from 1946 to 1974.

Head coaching record

Football

References

External links
 

1914 births
1996 deaths
Basketball coaches from Kansas
College tennis coaches in the United States
Eastern Illinois Panthers football coaches
Eastern Illinois Panthers men's basketball coaches
People from Charleston, Illinois
People from Lincoln Center, Kansas